FMO may refer to:
 Fenna-Matthews-Olson complex
 Fish Marketing Organisation, a statutory body of Hong Kong
 Flavin-containing monooxygenase
 Flexible macroblock ordering
 Fragment molecular orbital
 Frontier molecular orbital theory
 Münster Osnabrück International Airport in North Rhine-Westphalia, Germany
 Netherlands Development Finance Company